Lülle is a village in Saaremaa Parish, Saare County in western Estonia.

References

 

Villages in Saare County